

Results

References
 Official results

Mixed 3 m springboard synchro